Berchtold (also Berthold, Bertold, Bertolt) is a Germanic name, from the Old High German beruht "bright" or "brightly" and waltan "rule over". The name comes into fashion in the German High Middle Ages, from about the 11th century. The cognate Old English name is Beorhtwald, attested as the name of an archbishop in the 8th century.
Berchtold appears also as the name of the leader of the Wild Hunt in German folklore of the 16th century. The name is here replacing the female Perchta.

List
Notable people with the name include:

Given name
Bertulf (Archbishop of Trier) (d. 883) is in some chronicles also attested as "Berthold"
Berthold, Duke of Bavaria (d. 947)
Berthold II, Duke of Carinthia (d. 1078)
Berthold II, Duke of Swabia (1050-1111)
Saint Berthold, Berthold of Parma (d. 1111)
Blessed Berthold of Garsten (d. 1142) abbot
Blessed Berchtold of Engelberg (d.1197) abbot
Saint Bertold, Berthold of Calabria (d. 1195) crusader monk
Berthold of Hanover (d. 1198) abbot
Berthold V, Duke of Zähringen (1160-1218)
Berthold, Margrave of Baden (1906-1963)

Surname
 Dietmar Berchtold (born 1974), Austrian football midfielder
 Friedrich von Berchtold (1781–1876), Moravian botanist and physician.
 Joseph Berchtold (1897–1963), Nazi Party member and Reich Leader of the SS
 Count Leopold Berchtold (1863–1942), Austro-Hungarian foreign minister at the outbreak of  World War I
 Manuela Berchtold (born 1977), Australian freestyle skier

See also 
Berthold (disambiguation)
 Berchtoldstag

German-language surnames